Jyoti Kishanji Amge (born 16 December 1993) is an Indian actress notable for being the world's shortest living woman according to the Guinness World Records.

Her restricted height is due to a genetic disorder called primordial dwarfism.

Amge was featured in the 2009 documentary titled Body Shock: Two Foot Tall Teen. She was also a guest participant on Bigg Boss 6, an Indian television show. On 13 August 2014, she was cast in the fourth season of American Horror Story: Freak Show as Ma Petite.

In 2012, she met the world's shortest man, Chandra Bahadur Dangi of Nepal. The pair posed together for the 57th edition of the Guinness World Records.

Media appearances
Amge, together with Teo Mammucari, co-hosted Lo show dei record in 2012 on the Italian channel Canale 5.

In August 2014, Amge was cast in American Horror Story: Freak Show where she appeared as Ma Petite which premiered 8 October 2014.

Her wax statue is also present in Celebrity Wax Museum, Lonavala.

Filmography

Social service
Amge participated with the Nagpur Police to urge Indian citizens to stay at home during the COVID-19 lockdown in India.

See also 
 Dwarfism
 List of the verified shortest people
 Primordial dwarfism
 List of people with dwarfism

References

External links

 
World's Smallest Woman, Jyoti Amge, releases the World's Biggest Book in Jaipur City
Rediff Slide Show

1993 births
Living people
21st-century Indian actresses
Indian television actresses
Indian Hindus
Actors with dwarfism
Actresses from Nagpur
World record holders
Guinness World Records